John Robert Farrington (born 19 June 1947) is an English former professional footballer who played as a right winger.

Career
Born in Lynemouth, Farrington played for Wolverhampton Wanderers, Leicester City, Cardiff City and Northampton Town, making over 400 appearances in the Football League. He was part of the Leicester side that won the 1971 FA Charity Shield. He later became player-manager of AP Leamington.

References

1947 births
English footballers
English football managers
Wolverhampton Wanderers F.C. players
Leicester City F.C. players
Cardiff City F.C. players
Northampton Town F.C. players
Leamington F.C. players
English Football League players
Association football wingers
Living people
Footballers from Northumberland